Jutaí-Solimões Ecological Station is an ecological station in the state of Amazonas, Brazil. It protects an area of flooded and terra firme forest in the Amazon biome.

Location

The station lies between the Jutaí and Solimões rivers.
It covers parts of the municipalities of Amaturá, Jutaí, Santo Antônio do Içá and Tonantins in the state of Amazonas.
It is bounded to the east by the Rio Jutaí Extractive Reserve, on the opposite side of the Jutaí River, and to the west by the Javari-Buriti Area of Relevant Ecological Interest.
The Betânia Indigenous Territory overlaps the western part of the ESEC and the São Domingos do Jacapari e Estação Indigenous Territory overlaps the northern part.

History

The Jutaí-Solimões Ecological Reserve by federal decree 88.541 of 21 July 1983.
Ordnance 375 of 11 October 2001 recategorized the ecological reserve as an ecological station with the present name.
The Ecological Station is a "strict nature reserve" under IUCN protected area category Ia.
The purpose is to conserve nature and conduct scientific research.
It is administered by the Chico Mendes Institute for Biodiversity Conservation.
It became part of the Central Amazon Ecological Corridor, created in 2002.
The consultative council was created on 2 September 2011.

Environment

The Jutaí-Solimões Ecological Reserve is in the Amazon biome.
The whole area is flat and subject to constant flooding.
Vegetation types are typical of the igapó, floodplain and land environments in Amazonia.
The bald uakari (cacajao calvus rubicundus) is protected in the station.
The ecosystem is threatened by overfishing and illegal deforestation.

References

Sources

Protected areas of Amazonas (Brazilian state)
1983 establishments in Brazil
Ecological stations of Brazil
Protected areas established in 1983